Yon Haryono (born 16 February 1969) is an Indonesian weightlifter. He competed in the men's bantamweight event at the 1988 Summer Olympics.

References

External links
 

1969 births
Living people
Indonesian male weightlifters
Olympic weightlifters of Indonesia
Weightlifters at the 1988 Summer Olympics
Place of birth missing (living people)
20th-century Indonesian people
21st-century Indonesian people